Il gatto mammone is a 1975 Italian commedia sexy all'italiana directed by Nando Cicero.

Plot 
Sicilian Lollo Mascalucia, a small pasta factory owner has been married to Rosalia for seven years, pretending to all his fellow villagers that he doesn't want a child and so hiding the supposed "sterility" of his wife by various stratagems. Lollo however, after the death of his uncle becomes the only remaining heir of the Mascalucia family, and therefore resumes the idea of becoming a father. So, following an agreement with his wife, he finds a girl who already has a child, and is willing to give him an heir. However, there is no sign of a child, even with the young girl.  It's clear now that in fact Lollo is the one who is sterile and not his wife. So instead Rosalia will at last give him the longed-for son and heir, using a "substitute" for her husband.

Cast 
 Lando Buzzanca: Lollo Mascalucia
 Rossana Podestà: Rosalia
 Gloria Guida: Marietta
 Franco Giacobini: Priest
 Umberto Spadaro: Doctor  
 Grazia Di Marzà: Rosalia's Mother
 Tiberio Murgia: Gipsy
 Renzo Marignano: Urologist

See also 
 List of Italian films of 1975

References

External links

1975 films
Commedia sexy all'italiana
1970s sex comedy films
Films directed by Nando Cicero
Films scored by Carlo Rustichelli
Adultery in films
Films set in Sicily
1975 comedy films
1970s Italian films